The Jesup Subdivision is a railroad line owned by CSX Transportation in Georgia. The line runs from Jesup to Folkston where the Folkston Funnel railfan area is. The total length is 72.7 miles. At its north it continues south from the Nahunta Subdivision and at its south end it continues south as the Nahunta Subdivision.

In Waycross it also has a wye with the eastern terminus of the Thomasville Subdivision and southern terminus of the Fitzgerald Subdivision.

History

The Jesup Subdivision from Jesup to Waycross was originally a segment of the Atlantic and Gulf Railroad, which extended from Savannah to Bainbridge.  The line was built in 1859 just before the start of the American Civil War though it wouldn't be completed to Bainbridge until 1867.  The Atlantic and Gulf Railroad went bankrupt in 1877 and was bought in 1879 by Henry B. Plant and became incorporated into his Plant System.  It would be the main line of Plant's Savannah, Florida and Western Railway.

In 1880, Plant chartered the Waycross and Florida Railroad to run from Waycross south through Folkston into Florida.  The line was completed by 1881.

Waycross would become a busy railroad junction with many trains running along the eastern seaboard having to pass through.  Plant would then build the Folkston Cutoff directly from Jesup to Folkston for trains to bypass Waycross.

After the death of Henry Plant in 1899, the Plant System was bought by the Atlantic Coast Line Railroad.  The Atlantic Coast Line would designate the Folkston Cutoff route as their mainline (which is now CSX's Nahunta Subdivision) instead of the route through Waycross as Plant did.

The Atlantic Coast Line would become part of CSX by 1986.

See also
 List of CSX Transportation lines

References

CSX Transportation lines
Rail infrastructure in Georgia (U.S. state)